The cabinet of Gheorghe Argeșanu was the government of Romania from 21 September to 28 September 1939. After the assassination of his predecessor, Armand Călinescu, by the Iron Guard, the Argeșanu cabinet's primary achievement was apprehension and execution of the assassins and wave of killings of Iron Guardsmen. The government lasted only seven days and was followed by the Argetoianu cabinet.

Ministers
The ministers of the cabinet were as follows:

President of the Council of Ministers:
Gen. Gheorghe Argeșanu (21 - 28 September 1939)
Minister of the Interior:
Gabriel Marinescu (21 - 28 September 1939)
Minister of Foreign Affairs: 
Grigore Gafencu (21 - 28 September 1939)
Minister of Finance:
Mitiță Constantinescu (21 - 28 September 1939)
Minister of Justice:
Victor Iamandi (21 - 28 September 1939)
Minister of National Defence:
Gen. Ioan Ilcuș (21 - 28 September 1939)
Minister of Air and Marine:
Gen. Paul Teodorescu (21 - 28 September 1939)
Minister of Materiel:
Victor Slăvescu (21 - 28 September 1939)
Minister of National Economy:
Ion Bujoiu (21 - 28 September 1939)
Minister of Agriculture and Property
Nicolae Cornățeanu (21 - 28 September 1939)
Minister of National Education:
Petre Andrei (21 - 28 September 1939)
Minister of Religious Affairs and the Arts:
Nicolae Zigre (21 - 28 September 1939)
Minister of Labour:
Mihail Ralea (21 - 28 September 1939)
Minister of Health and Social Security
Gen. Nicolae Marinescu (21 - 28 September 1939)
Minister of Public Works and Communications:
Mihail Ghelmegeanu (21 - 28 September 1939)
Minister of State for Minorities:
Silviu Dragomir (21 - 28 September 1939)

References

Cabinets of Romania
Cabinets established in 1939
Cabinets disestablished in 1939
1939 establishments in Romania
1939 disestablishments in Romania